Asbestiform is a crystal habit. It describes a mineral that grows in a fibrous aggregate of high tensile strength, flexible, long, and thin crystals that readily separate. The most common asbestiform mineral is chrysotile, commonly called "white asbestos", a magnesium phyllosilicate part of the serpentine group. Other asbestiform minerals include riebeckite, an amphibole whose fibrous form is known as crocidolite or "blue asbestos", and brown asbestos, a cummingtonite-grunerite solid solution series. 

The United States Environmental Protection Agency explains that, "In general, exposure may occur only when the asbestos-containing material is disturbed or damaged in some way to release particles and fibers into the air."

"Mountain leather" is an old-fashioned term for flexible, sheet-like natural formations of asbestiform minerals which resemble leather. Asbestos-containing minerals known to form mountain leather include: actinolite, palygorskite, saponite, sepiolite, tremolite, and zeolite.

See also
Chrysotile

References

Crystallography
Mineralogy
Mineral habits
Asbestos